Leah McFall (born 1 July 1989) is a British singer-songwriter from Newtownabbey, Northern Ireland. She finished as the runner-up on the second series of the BBC One talent series The Voice.

Early life
McFall began her singing career at her local church, Glenabbey, at the age of six. She was a pupil at Antrim Grammar School. During her childhood she listened to Motown, jazz, gospel, folk and pop music which was played around the family home, and influences both her vocal and song writing style. After years of gigging around Northern Ireland, Leah moved to London to attend college. After six months there, she began playing at the  Ronnie Scott's Jazz Club.

Career

2013: The Voice UK
In 2013, McFall auditioned for the second series of The Voice, where she chose to join Will's team. In the battle round, she sang against CJ Edwards. The pair duetted on the Michael Jackson song "The Way You Make Me Feel", and McFall was chosen to proceed. In the Knockout round, will.i.am gave his Fast Pass to McFall and she performed Minnie Riperton's "Lovin' You". In the first live show, McFall sang "I Will Survive" by Gloria Gaynor. The studio version of her performance charted at number 16 on the UK Singles Chart, selling 19,213 copies within a week. A week later, it rose to number 8. McFall then performed the Fugees' version of "Killing Me Softly" in the semi-final on 15 June 2013. The result was revealed that McFall had received the most public votes, and would therefore represent Team Will in the final.

Performances

2013–present: Weird to Wonderful and independent releases 
In July 2013, Will.i.am revealed that he would release a new version of his single "Bang Bang" featuring McFall. On 14 July 2013, McFall made her debut performance at the Wireless Festival alongside her mentor will.i.am. During the tour, McFall revealed she would release three music videos before her first official single and album are released. The first of these videos, "No Ordinary Love", was released on 1 February 2014.
On 6 June, McFall announced the title of her first official single, "Home" featuring will.i.am. The single was released on 27 July 2014. On 21 July 2014, McFall announced her debut album, titled Weird to Wonderful, was due to be released in October 2014, but was cancelled, and she was dropped from her record label. McFall returned in September 2016 with "Wolf Den", released independently. This was followed by the release of single "Happy Human", and the release of her EP, INK. The release of the EP was preceded by the "INK Tour", which saw McFall perform at dates around the UK and Ireland. Since INK, McFall has released three singles; "Somber", "White X" and "Marriage".

Discography

Studio albums

Extended plays

Singles

As lead artist

Promotional singles

Guest appearances

Music videos

Concert tours
Supporting act
 Leon Jackson solo tour (2010) (supporting Leon Jackson)
 #willpower Tour (2013) (supporting will.i.am)
 Forestry Tour (2014) (supporting Jessie J)
Headlining act
INK tour. (2017)

References

External links
 

1989 births
Blues singers from Northern Ireland
British contemporary R&B singers
Living people
People from Newtownabbey
Pop singers from Northern Ireland
Women singer-songwriters from Northern Ireland
The Voice UK contestants
21st-century women singers from Northern Ireland
Musicians from County Antrim
Capitol Records artists